Pušić  may refer to:

 Antonije Pušić (born 1963), better known as Rambo Amadeus, Montenegrin singer
 Berislav Pušić, Bosnian Croat known for being indicted and convicted at the ICTY
 Boris Pušić, Croatian football manager
 Bosiljka Pušić (born 1936), Montenegrin writer and poet
 Domagoj Pušić (born 1991), Croatian football player
 Marino Pušić (born 1971), Croatian football player
 Martin Pušić (born 1987), Austrian footballer of Croatian origin
 Nikica Pušić-Koroljević (born 1983), Croatian handball player
 Petar Pušić (born 1999), Swiss footballer of Croatian descent
 Teodora Pušić (born 1993), Serbian volleyball player

See also
 
 Pete Pussick, a fictional character from tales about Joe Magarac
 Pusić

Croatian surnames
Montenegrin surnames